Rubus hancinianus is a rare North American species of flowering plant in the rose family. It has been found only in the US states of Kansas and Missouri in the central Great Plains.

The genetics of Rubus is extremely complex, so that it is difficult to decide on which groups should be recognized as species. There are many rare species with limited ranges such as this. Further study is suggested to clarify the taxonomy.

References

hancinianus
Plants described in 1943
Flora of Missouri
Flora of Kansas
Flora without expected TNC conservation status